United States v. Armstrong, 517 U.S. 456 (1996), was a case heard by the Supreme Court of the United States.

Syllabus
Respondents filed a motion to dismiss their indictment for "crack" cocaine and other federal charges, alleging they were selected for prosecution based on their race. The motion was granted by the District Court and affirmed by the Ninth Circuit en banc, which ruled the proof requirements do not compel the defendant to demonstrate the Government has failed to prosecute others who are similarly situated.

The Supreme Court held that:
 Federal Rule of Criminal Procedure 16, which governs discovery in criminal cases, exempts the work product of Government attorneys and agents made in connection with the case's investigation.
 Under the equal protection component of the Due Process Clause of the Fifth Amendment, the decision whether to prosecute may not be based on an arbitrary classification such as race or religion. Thus a defendant must produce credible evidence that similarly situated defendants of other races could have been prosecuted, but were not, in order to be entitled to discovery.

The Supreme Court reversed and remanded, 8–1. Chief Justice William Rehnquist wrote the opinion of the court, and was joined by Justices Sandra Day O'Connor, Antonin Scalia, Anthony Kennedy, David Souter, Clarence Thomas, and Ruth Bader Ginsburg. Justice Stephen Breyer joined the majority opinion in part and also wrote a separate concurring opinion. Justice John P. Stevens wrote the dissenting opinion.

External links
 

United States Supreme Court cases
United States Supreme Court cases of the Rehnquist Court
United States criminal due process case law
United States equal protection case law
1996 in United States case law